Gross domestic product (GDP) is a monetary measure of the market value of all the final goods and services produced and sold in a specific time period by a country or countries, generally "without double counting the intermediate goods and services used up to produce them". GDP is most often used by the government of a single country to measure its economic health. Due to its complex and subjective nature, this measure is often revised before being considered a reliable indicator. GDP (nominal) per capita does not, however, reflect differences in the cost of living and the inflation rates of the countries; therefore, using a basis of GDP per capita at purchasing power parity (PPP) may be more useful when comparing living standards between nations, while nominal GDP is more useful comparing national economies on the international market. Total GDP can also be broken down into the contribution of each industry or sector of the economy. The ratio of GDP to the total population of the region is the per capita GDP (also called the Mean Standard of Living). 

GDP definitions are maintained by a number of national and international economic organizations. The Organisation for Economic Co-operation and Development (OECD) defines GDP as "an aggregate measure of production equal to the sum of the gross values added of all resident and institutional units engaged in production and services (plus any taxes, and minus any subsidies, on products not included in the value of their outputs)".  An IMF publication states that, "GDP measures the monetary value of final goods and services—that are bought by the final user—produced in a country in a given period of time (say a quarter or a year)."

GDP is often used as a metric for international comparisons as well as a broad measure of economic progress. It is often considered to be the world's most powerful statistical indicator of national development and progress. However, critics of the growth imperative often argue that GDP measures were never intended to measure progress, and leave out key other externalities, such as resource extraction, environmental impact and unpaid domestic work. Critics frequently propose alternative economic models such as doughnut economics which use other measures of success or alternative indicators such as the OECD's Better Life Index as better approaches to measuring the effect of the economy on human development and well being.

History

William Petty came up with a basic concept of GDP to attack landlords against unfair taxation during warfare between the Dutch and the English between 1654 and 1676. Charles Davenant developed the method further in 1695. The modern concept of GDP was first developed by Simon Kuznets for a 1934 U.S. Congress report, where he warned against its use as a measure of welfare (see below under limitations and criticisms). After the Bretton Woods conference in 1944, GDP became the main tool for measuring a country's economy. At that time gross national product (GNP) was the preferred estimate, which differed from GDP in that it measured production by a country's citizens at home and abroad rather than its 'resident institutional units' (see OECD definition above). The switch from GNP to GDP in the United States occurred in 1991. The role that measurements of GDP played in World War II was crucial to the subsequent political acceptance of GDP values as indicators of national development and progress. A crucial role was played here by the U.S. Department of Commerce under Milton Gilbert where ideas from Kuznets were embedded into institutions. 

The history of the concept of GDP should be distinguished from the history of changes in many ways of estimating it. The value added by firms is relatively easy to calculate from their accounts, but the value added by the public sector, by financial industries, and by intangible asset creation is more complex. These activities are increasingly important in developed economies, and the international conventions governing their estimation and their inclusion or exclusion in GDP regularly change in an attempt to keep up with industrial advances. In the words of one academic economist, "The actual number for GDP is, therefore, the product of a vast patchwork of statistics and a complicated set of processes carried out on the raw data to fit them to the conceptual framework."

China officially adopted GDP in 1993 as its indicator of economic performance. Previously, China had relied on a Marxist-inspired national accounting system.

Determining gross domestic product (GDP)

GDP can be determined in three ways, all of which should, theoretically, give the same result. They are the production (or output or value added) approach, the income approach, and the speculated expenditure approach. It is representative of the total output and income within an economy. 

The most direct of the three is the production approach, which sums the outputs of every class of enterprise to arrive at the total. The expenditure approach works on the principle that all of the product must be bought by somebody, therefore the value of the total product must be equal to people's total expenditures in buying things. The income approach works on the principle that the incomes of the productive factors ("producers", colloquially) must be equal to the value of their product, and determines GDP by finding the sum of all producers' incomes.

Production approach
Also known as the Value Added Approach, it calculates how much value is contributed at each stage of production.

This approach mirrors the OECD (Organisation for Economic Co-operation and Development) definition given above.

 Estimate the gross value of domestic output out of the many various economic activities;
 Determine the intermediate consumption, i.e., the cost of material, supplies and services used to produce final goods or services.
 Deduct intermediate consumption from gross value to obtain the gross value added.

Gross value added =                                             gross value of output – value of intermediate consumption.

Value of output = value of the total sales of goods and services plus value of changes in the inventory.

The sum of the gross value added in the various economic activities is known as "GDP at factor cost".

GDP at factor cost plus indirect taxes less subsidies on products = "GDP at producer price".

For measuring output of domestic product, economic activities (i.e. industries) are classified into various sectors. After classifying economic activities, the output of each sector is calculated by any of the following two methods:
 By multiplying the output of each sector by their respective market price and adding them together
 By collecting data on gross sales and inventories from the records of companies and adding them together

The value of output of all sectors is then added to get the gross value of output at factor cost. Subtracting each sector's intermediate consumption from gross output value gives the GVA (=GDP) at factor cost. Adding indirect tax minus subsidies to GVA (GDP) at factor cost gives the "GVA (GDP) at producer prices".

Income approach

The second way of estimating GDP is to use "the sum of primary incomes distributed by resident producer units".

If GDP is calculated this way it is sometimes called gross domestic income (GDI), or GDP (I). GDI should provide the same amount as the expenditure method described later. By definition, GDI is equal to GDP. In practice, however, measurement errors will make the two figures slightly off when reported by national statistical agencies.

This method measures GDP by adding incomes that firms pay households for factors of production they hire - wages for labour, interest for capital, rent for land and profits for entrepreneurship.

The US "National Income and Expenditure Accounts" divide incomes into five categories:
 Wages, salaries, and supplementary labour income
 Corporate profits
 Interest and miscellaneous investment income
 Farmers' incomes
 Income from non-farm unincorporated businesses
These five income components sum to net domestic income at factor cost.

Two adjustments must be made to get GDP:
 Indirect taxes minus subsidies are added to get from factor cost to market prices.
 Depreciation (or capital consumption allowance) is added to get from net domestic product to gross domestic product.

Total income can be subdivided according to various schemes, leading to various formulae for GDP measured by the income approach. A common one is:

 GDP =  +  +  + 
 Compensation of employees (COE) measures the total remuneration to employees for work done. It includes wages and salaries, as well as employer contributions to social security and other such programs.
 Gross operating surplus (GOS) is the surplus due to owners of incorporated businesses. Often called profits, although only a subset of total costs are subtracted from gross output to calculate GOS.
 Gross mixed income (GMI) is the same measure as GOS, but for unincorporated businesses. This often includes most small businesses.

The sum of COE, GOS and GMI is called total factor income; it is the income of all of the factors of production in society. It measures the value of GDP at factor (basic) prices. The difference between basic prices and final prices (those used in the expenditure calculation) is the total taxes and subsidies that the government has levied or paid on that production. So adding taxes less subsidies on production and imports converts GDP(I) at factor cost to GDP(I) at final prices.

Total factor income is also sometimes expressed as:
Total factor income = employee compensation + corporate profits + proprietor's income + rental income + net interest

Expenditure approach
The third way to estimate GDP is to calculate the sum of the final uses of goods and services (all uses except intermediate consumption) measured in purchasers' prices.

Market goods that are produced are purchased by someone. In the case where a good is produced and unsold, the standard accounting convention is that the producer has bought the good from themselves. Therefore, measuring the total expenditure used to buy things is a way of measuring production. This is known as the expenditure method of calculating GDP.

Components of GDP by expenditure

GDP (Y) is the sum of consumption (C), investment (I), government Expenditures (G) and net exports (X – M).
Y = C + I + G + (X − M)

Here is a description of each GDP component:
 C (consumption) is normally the largest GDP component in the economy, consisting of private expenditures in the economy (household final consumption expenditure). These personal expenditures fall under one of the following categories: durable goods, nondurable goods, and services. Examples include food, rent, jewelry, gasoline, and medical expenses, but not the purchase of new housing.
 I (investment) includes, for instance, business investment in equipment, but does not include exchanges of existing assets. Examples include construction of a new mine, purchase of software, or purchase of machinery and equipment for a factory. Spending by households (not government) on new houses is also included in investment. In contrast to its colloquial meaning, "investment" in GDP does not mean purchases of financial products. Buying financial products is classed as 'saving', as opposed to investment. This avoids double-counting: if one buys shares in a company, and the company uses the money received to buy plant, equipment, etc., the amount will be counted toward GDP when the company spends the money on those things; to also count it when one gives it to the company would be to count two times an amount that only corresponds to one group of products. Buying bonds or companies' equity shares is a swapping of deeds, a transfer of claims on future production, not directly an expenditure on products; buying an existing building will involve a positive investment by the buyer and a negative investment by the seller, netting to zero overall investment.
 G (government spending) is the sum of government expenditures on final goods and services. It includes salaries of public servants, purchases of weapons for the military and any investment expenditure by a government. It does not include any transfer payments, such as social security or unemployment benefits. Analyses outside the USA will often treat government investment as part of investment rather than government spending.
 X (exports) represents gross exports. GDP captures the amount a country produces, including goods and services produced for other nations' consumption, therefore exports are added.
 M (imports) represents gross imports. Imports are subtracted since imported goods will be included in the terms G, I, or C, and must be deducted to avoid counting foreign supply as domestic.

Note that C, I, and G are expenditures on final goods and services; expenditures on intermediate goods and services do not count. (Intermediate goods and services are those used by businesses to produce other goods and services within the accounting year.) So for example if a car manufacturer buys auto parts, assembles the car and sells it, only the final car sold is counted towards the GDP. Meanwhile, if a person buys replacement auto parts to install them on their car, those are counted towards the GDP.

According to the U.S. Bureau of Economic Analysis, which is responsible for calculating the national accounts in the United States, "In general, the source data for the expenditures components are considered more reliable than those for the income components [see income method, above]."

Encyclopedia Britannica records an alternate way of measuring exports minus imports: notating it as the single variable NX.

GDP and GNI
GDP can be contrasted with gross national product (GNP) or, as it is now known, gross national income (GNI). The difference is that GDP defines its scope according to location, while GNI defines its scope according to ownership. In a global context, world GDP and world GNI are, therefore, equivalent terms.

GDP is product produced within a country's borders; GNI is product produced by enterprises owned by a country's citizens. The two would be the same if all of the productive enterprises in a country were owned by its own citizens and those citizens did not own productive enterprises in any other countries. In practice, however, foreign ownership makes GDP and GNI non-identical. Production within a country's borders, but by an enterprise owned by somebody outside the country, counts as part of its GDP but not its GNI; on the other hand, production by an enterprise located outside the country, but owned by one of its citizens, counts as part of its GNI but not its GDP.

For example, the GNI of the USA is the value of output produced by American-owned firms, regardless of where the firms are located. Similarly, if a country becomes increasingly in debt, and spends large amounts of income servicing this debt this will be reflected in a decreased GNI but not a decreased GDP. Similarly, if a country sells off its resources to entities outside their country this will also be reflected over time in decreased GNI, but not decreased GDP. This would make the use of GDP more attractive for politicians in countries with increasing national debt and decreasing assets.

Gross national income (GNI) equals GDP plus income receipts from the rest of the world minus income payments to the rest of the world.

In 1991, the United States switched from using GNP to using GDP as its primary measure of production.
The relationship between United States GDP and GNP is shown in table 1.7.5 of the National Income and Product Accounts.

Another example that amplifies the difference among GDP and GNI are the comparison of developed and developing country indicators. The GDP of Japan for 2020 is 5,040,107.75 USD (in a million). Predictably, as a developed country, Japan has a higher  GNI of 182,779.46 USD  (in million), which is indicative that the production level in the country is higher than that of national production. On the other hand, the case with Armenia is the opposite, with GDP being lower than GNI by 196.12 USD  (in million). This demonstrates that countries receive investments and foreign aid from abroad.

International standards
The international standard for measuring GDP is contained in the book System of National Accounts (2008), which was prepared by representatives of the International Monetary Fund, European Union, Organisation for Economic Co-operation and Development, United Nations and World Bank. The publication is normally referred to as SNA2008 to distinguish it from the previous edition published in 1993 (SNA93) or 1968 (called SNA68) 

SNA2008 provides a set of rules and procedures for the measurement of national accounts. The standards are designed to be flexible, to allow for differences in local statistical needs and conditions.

National measurement

Within each country GDP is normally measured by a national government statistical agency, as private sector organizations normally do not have access to the information required (especially information on expenditure and production by governments).

Nominal GDP and adjustments to GDP

The raw GDP figure as given by the equations above is called the nominal, historical, or current, GDP. When one compares GDP figures from one year to another, it is desirable to compensate for changes in the value of money –  for the effects of inflation or deflation. To make it more meaningful for year-to-year comparisons, it may be multiplied by the ratio between the value of money in the year the GDP was measured and the value of money in a base year.

Suppose also that inflation had halved the value of its currency over that period. To meaningfully compare its GDP in 2000 to its GDP in 1990, we could multiply the GDP in 2000 by one-half, to make it relative to 1990 as a base year. The result would be that the GDP in 2000 equals  ×  = , in 1990 monetary terms. We would see that the country's GDP had realistically increased 50 percent over that period, not 200 percent, as it might appear from the raw GDP data. The GDP adjusted for changes in money value in this way is called the real, or constant, GDP.

The factor used to convert GDP from current to constant values in this way is called the GDP deflator. Unlike consumer price index, which measures inflation or deflation in the price of household consumer goods, the GDP deflator measures changes in the prices of all domestically produced goods and services in an economy including investment goods and government services, as well as household consumption goods.

Constant-GDP figures allow us to calculate a GDP growth rate, which indicates how much a country's production has increased (or decreased, if the growth rate is negative) compared to the previous year.
 Real GDP growth rate for year n = 

Another thing that it may be desirable to account for is population growth. If a country's GDP doubled over a certain period, but its population tripled, the increase in GDP may not mean that the standard of living increased for the country's residents; the average person in the country is producing less than they were before. Per-capita GDP is a measure to account for population growth.

Standard of living and GDP: wealth distribution and externalities
GDP per capita is often used as an indicator of living standards.

The major advantage of GDP per capita as an indicator of standard of living is that it is measured frequently, widely, and consistently. It is measured frequently in that most countries provide information on GDP on a quarterly basis, allowing trends to be seen quickly. It is measured widely in that some measure of GDP is available for almost every country in the world, allowing inter-country comparisons. It is measured consistently in that the technical definition of GDP is relatively consistent among countries.

GDP does not include several factors that influence the standard of living. In particular, it fails to account for:
 Externalities – Economic growth may entail an increase in negative externalities that are not directly measured in GDP. Increased industrial output might grow GDP, but any pollution is not counted.
 Non-market transactions – GDP excludes activities that are not provided through the market, such as household production, bartering of goods and services, and volunteer or unpaid services.
 Non-monetary economy – GDP omits economies where no money comes into play at all, resulting in inaccurate or abnormally low GDP figures. For example, in countries with major business transactions occurring informally, portions of local economy are not easily registered. Bartering may be more prominent than the use of money, even extending to services.
 Quality improvements and inclusion of new products – by not fully adjusting for quality improvements and new products, GDP understates true economic growth. For instance, although computers today are less expensive and more powerful than computers from the past, GDP treats them as the same products by only accounting for the monetary value. The introduction of new products is also difficult to measure accurately and is not reflected in GDP despite the fact that it may increase the standard of living. For example, even the richest person in 1900 could not purchase standard products, such as antibiotics and cell phones, that an average consumer can buy today, since such modern conveniences did not exist then.
 Sustainability of growth – GDP is a measurement of economic historic activity and is not necessarily a projection.
 Wealth distribution – GDP does not account for variances in incomes of various demographic groups. See income inequality metrics for discussion of a variety of inequality-based economic measures.

It can be argued that GDP per capita as an indicator standard of living is correlated with these factors, capturing them indirectly. As a result, GDP per capita as a standard of living is a continued usage because most people have a fairly accurate idea of what it is and know it is tough to come up with quantitative measures for such constructs as happiness, quality of life, and well-being.

Limitations and criticisms

Limitations at introduction 
Simon Kuznets, the economist who developed the first comprehensive set of measures of national income, stated in his second report to the U.S. Congress in 1937, in a section titled "Uses and Abuses of National Income Measurements":
 The valuable capacity of the human mind to simplify a complex situation in a compact characterization becomes dangerous when not controlled in terms of definitely stated criteria. With quantitative measurements especially, the definiteness of the result suggests, often misleadingly, a precision and simplicity in the outlines of the object measured. Measurements of national income are subject to this type of illusion and resulting abuse, especially since they deal with matters that are the center of conflict of opposing social groups where the effectiveness of an argument is often contingent upon oversimplification.  [...]

All these qualifications upon estimates of national income as an index of productivity are just as important when income measurements are interpreted from the point of view of economic welfare. But in the latter case additional difficulties will be suggested to anyone who wants to penetrate below the surface of total figures and market values. Economic welfare cannot be adequately measured unless the personal distribution of income is known. And no income measurement undertakes to estimate the reverse side of income, that is, the intensity and unpleasantness of effort going into the earning of income. The welfare of a nation can, therefore, scarcely be inferred from a measurement of national income as defined above. In 1962, Kuznets stated:Distinctions must be kept in mind between quantity and quality of growth, between costs and returns, and between the short and long run. Goals for more growth should specify more growth of what and for what.

Further criticisms 
Ever since the development of GDP, multiple observers have pointed out limitations of using GDP as the overarching measure of economic and social progress. For example, many environmentalists argue that GDP is a poor measure of social progress because it does not take into account harm to the environment. Furthermore, the GDP does not consider human health nor the educational aspect of a population. American politician Robert F. Kennedy criticized the GDP as a measure of “everything except that which makes life worthwhile”. He said that it "does not allow for the health of our children, the quality of their education or the joy of their play.”

Although a high or rising level of GDP is often associated with increased economic and social progress, the opposite sometimes occurs. For example, Jean Drèze and Amartya Sen have pointed out that an increase in GDP or in GDP growth does not necessarily lead to a higher standard of living, particularly in areas such as healthcare and education. Another important area that does not necessarily improve along with GDP is political liberty, which is most notable in China, where GDP growth is strong yet political liberties are heavily restricted. GDP does not account for the distribution of income among the residents of a country, because GDP is merely an aggregate measure. An economy may be highly developed or growing rapidly, but also contain a wide gap between the rich and the poor in a society. These inequalities often occur on the lines of race, ethnicity, gender, religion, or other minority status within countries. This can lead to misleading characterizations of economic well-being if the income distribution is heavily skewed toward the high end, as the poorer residents will not directly benefit from the overall level of wealth and income generated in their country (their purchasing power can decline, even as the mean GDP per capita rises). GDP per capita measures (like aggregate GDP measures) do not account for income distribution (and tend to overstate the average income per capita). For example, South Africa during apartheid ranked high in terms of GDP per capita, but the benefits of this immense wealth and income were not shared equally among its citizens. An inequality which the United Nations Sustainable Development Goal 10 amongst other global initiatives aims to address.

GDP excludes the value of household and other unpaid work. Some, including Martha Nussbaum, argue that this value should be included in measuring GDP, as household labor is largely a substitute for goods and services that would otherwise be purchased with money. Even under conservative estimates, the value of unpaid labor in Australia has been calculated to be over 50% of the country's GDP. A later study analyzed this value in other countries, with results ranging from a low of about 15% in Canada (using conservative estimates) to high of nearly 70% in the United Kingdom (using more liberal estimates). For the United States, the value was estimated to be between about 20% on the low end to nearly 50% on the high end, depending on the methodology being used. Because many public policies are shaped by GDP calculations and by the related field of national accounts, public policy might differ if unpaid work were included in total GDP. Some economists have advocated for changes in the way public policies are formed and implemented.

The UK's Natural Capital Committee highlighted the shortcomings of GDP in its advice to the UK Government in 2013, pointing out that GDP "focuses on flows, not stocks.  As a result, an economy can run down its assets yet, at the same time, record high levels of GDP growth, until a point is reached where the depleted assets act as a check on future growth". They then went on to say that "it is apparent that the recorded GDP growth rate overstates the sustainable growth rate.  Broader measures of wellbeing and wealth are needed for this and there is a danger that short-term decisions based solely on what is currently measured by national accounts may prove to be costly in the long-term".

It has been suggested that countries that have authoritarian governments, such as the People's Republic of China, and Russia, inflate their GDP figures.

Research and development about the relation between GDP and use of GDP and reality 

Instances of GDP measures have been considered numbers that are artificial constructs. In 2020 scientists, as part of a World Scientists' Warning to Humanity-associated series, warned that worldwide growth in affluence in terms of GDP-metrics has increased resource use and pollutant emissions with affluent citizens of the world – in terms of e.g. resource-intensive consumption – being responsible for most negative environmental impacts and central to a transition to safer, sustainable conditions. They summarised evidence, presented solution approaches and stated that far-reaching lifestyle changes need to complement technological advancements and that existing societies, economies and cultures incite consumption expansion and that the structural imperative for growth in competitive market economies inhibits societal change. Sarah Arnold, Senior Economist at the New Economics Foundation (NEF) stated that "GDP includes activities that are detrimental to our economy and society in the long term, such as deforestation, strip mining, overfishing and so on". The number of trees that are net lost annually is estimated to be approximately 10 billion. The global average annual deforested land in the 2015–2020 demi-decade was 10 million hectares and the average annual net forest area loss in the 2000–2010 decade 4.7 million hectares, according to the Global Forest Resources Assessment 2020. According to one study, depending on the level of wealth inequality, higher GDP-growth can be associated with more deforestation. In 2019 "agriculture and agribusiness" accounted for 24 % of the GDP of Brazil, where a large share of annual net tropical forest loss occurred and is associated with sizable portions of this economic activity domain. The number of obese adults was approximately 600 million (12%) in 2015. In 2013 scientists reported that large improvements in health only lead to modest long-term increases in GDP per capita. After developing an abstract metric similar to GDP, the Center for Partnership Studies highlighted that GDP "and other metrics that reflect and perpetuate them" may not be useful for facilitating the production of products and provision of services that are useful – or comparatively more useful – to society, and instead may "actually encourage, rather than discourage, destructive activities". Steve Cohen of the Earth Institute elucidated that while GDP does not distinguish between different activities (or lifestyles), "all consumption behaviors are not created equal and do not have the same impact on environmental sustainability". Johan Rockström, director of the Potsdam Institute for Climate Impact Research, noted that "it's difficult to see if the current G.D.P.-based model of economic growth can go hand-in-hand with rapid cutting of emissions", which nations have agreed to attempt under the Paris Agreement in order to mitigate real-world impacts of climate change. Some have pointed out that GDP did not adapt to sociotechnical changes to give a more accurate picture of the modern economy and does not encapsulate the value of new activities such as delivering price-free information and entertainment on social media. In 2017 Diane Coyle explained that GDP excludes much unpaid work, writing that "many people contribute free digital work such as writing open-source software that can substitute for marketed equivalents, and it clearly has great economic value despite a price of zero", which constitutes a common criticism "of the reliance on GDP as the measure of economic success" especially after the emergence of the digital economy. Similarly GDP does not value or distinguish for environmental protection. A 2020 study found that "poor regions' GDP grows faster by attracting more polluting production after connection to China's expressway system. GDP may not be a tool capable of recognizing how much natural capital agents of the economy are building or protecting.

Proposals to overcome GDP limitations 
In response to these and other limitations of using GDP, alternative approaches have emerged.
 In the 1980s, Amartya Sen and Martha Nussbaum developed the capability approach, which focuses on the functional capabilities enjoyed by people within a country, rather than the aggregate wealth held within a country. These capabilities consist of the functions that a person is able to achieve.
 In 1990, Mahbub ul Haq, a Pakistani economist at the United Nations, introduced the Human Development Index (HDI). The HDI is a composite index of life expectancy at birth, adult literacy rate and standard of living measured as a logarithmic function of GDP, adjusted to purchasing power parity.
 In 1989, John B. Cobb and Herman Daly introduced Index of Sustainable Economic Welfare (ISEW) by taking into account various other factors such as consumption of nonrenewable resources and degradation of the environment. The new formula deducted from GDP (personal consumption + public non-defensive expenditures - private defensive expenditures + capital formation + services from domestic labour - costs of environmental degradation - depreciation of natural capital)
 In 2005, Med Jones, an American Economist, at the International Institute of Management, introduced the first secular Gross National Happiness Index a.k.a. Gross National Well-being framework and Index to complement GDP economics with additional seven dimensions, including environment, education, and government, work, social and health (mental and physical) indicators. The proposal was inspired by the King of Bhutan's GNH philosophy.
 In 2009 the European Union released a communication titled GDP and beyond: Measuring progress in a changing world that identified five actions to improve indicators of progress in ways that make them more responsive to the concerns of its citizens.
 In 2009 Professors Joseph Stiglitz, Amartya Sen, and Jean-Paul Fitoussi at the Commission on the Measurement of Economic Performance and Social Progress (CMEPSP), formed by French President, Nicolas Sarkozy published a proposal to overcome the limitation of GDP economics to expand the focus to well-being economics with a well-being framework consisting of health, environment, work, physical safety, economic safety, and political freedom.
 In 2008, the Centre for Bhutan Studies began publishing the Bhutan Gross National Happiness (GNH) Index, whose contributors to happiness include physical, mental, and spiritual health; time balance; social and community vitality; cultural vitality; education; living standards; good governance; and ecological vitality.
 In 2013, the OECD Better Life Index was published by the OECD. The dimensions of the index included health, economic, workplace, income, jobs, housing, civic engagement, and life satisfaction.
 Since 2012, John Helliwell, Richard Layard and Jeffrey Sachs have edited an annual World Happiness Report which reports a national measure of subjective well-being, derived from a single survey question on satisfaction with life.  GDP explains some of the cross-national variation in life satisfaction, but more of it is explained by other, social variables (See 2013 World Happiness Report).
 In 2019, Serge Pierre Besanger published a "GDP 3.0" proposal which combines an expanded GNI formula which he calls GNIX, with a Palma ratio and a set of environmental metrics based on the Daly Rule.
 In the beginning of the 21st century the World Economic Forum published a series of analyses and propositions to create economic measurement tools more effective than GDP.

Problems with GDP data

Manipulation of data 
A peer-reviewed study published in the Journal of Political Economy in October 2022 found signs of manipulation of economic growth statistics in the majority of countries. According to the study, this mainly applied to countries that were governed semi-authoritarian/authoritarian or did not have a functioning separation of powers. The study took the annual growth in brightness of lights at night, as measured by satellites, and compared it to officially reported economic growth. Authoritarian states had consistently higher reported growth in GDP than their growth in night lights would suggest. An effect that also cannot be explained by different economic structures, sector composition or other factors. Incorrect growth statistics can also falsify indicators such as GDP or GDP per capita.

Lists of countries by their GDP

 Lists of countries by GDP
 List of countries by GDP (nominal), (per capita)
 List of continents by GDP
 List of countries by GDP (PPP), (per capita)
 List of countries by real GDP growth rate, (per capita)
 List of countries by GDP sector composition
 List of countries by past and projected GDP (PPP), (per capita), (nominal), (per capita)

See also

 Economic growth
 OECD Better Life Index
 Chained volume series
 Circular flow of income
 Economy monetization
 GDP density
 Genuine progress indicator
 Gross regional domestic product
 Gross regional product
 Inventory investment
 Modified gross national income
 List of countries by average wage
 Disposable household and per capita income
 List of economic reports by U.S. government agencies
 Misery index (economics)
 National average salary
 Potential output
 Productivism
 Social Progress Index

References

Further reading 

 Australian Bureau for Statistics, Australian National Accounts: Concepts, Sources and Methods , 2000. Retrieved November 2009. In depth explanations of how GDP and other national accounts items are determined.
 
 Joseph E. Stiglitz, "Measuring What Matters: Obsession with one financial figure, GDP, has worsened people's health, happiness and the environment, and economists want to replace it", Scientific American, vol. 323, no. 2 (August 2020), pp. 24–31.
 United States Department of Commerce, Bureau of Economic Analysis, . Retrieved November 2009. In-depth explanations of how GDP and other national accounts items are determined.

 The Power of a Single Number: A Political History of GDP by Philipp Lepenies
 The Little Big Number: How GDP Came to Rule the World and What to Do About It by Dirk Philipsen

External links 

 Global
 Australian Bureau of Statistics Manual on GDP measurement
 GDP-indexed bonds
 OECD GDP chart
 UN Statistical Databases
 World Development Indicators (WDI) at Worldbank.org
 World GDP Chart (since 1960)

 Data
 Bureau of Economic Analysis: Official United States GDP data
 Historicalstatistics.org: Links to historical statistics on GDP for countries and regions, maintained by the Department of Economic History at Stockholm University.
 Quandl - GDP by country - downloadable in CSV, Excel, JSON or XML
 Historical U.S. GDP (yearly data), 1790–present, maintained by Samuel H. Williamson and Lawrence H. Officer, both professors of economics at the University of Illinois at Chicago.
 Google – public data: GDP and Personal Income of the U.S. (annual): Nominal Gross Domestic Product
 The Maddison Project of the  Groningen Growth and Development Centre at the University of Groningen, the Netherlands.  This project continues and extends the work of Angus Maddison in collating all the available, credible data estimating GDP for countries around the world.  This includes data for some countries for over 2,000 years back to 1 CE and for essentially all countries since 1950.

 Articles and books

 Gross Domestic Product: An Economy’s All, International Monetary Fund.
 Stiglitz JE, Sen A, Fitoussi J-P. Mismeasuring our Lives: Why GDP Doesn't Add Up, New Press, New York, 2010
 "What's wrong with the GDP?", The Genuine Progress Indicator: Summary of Data and Methodology, Redefining Progress C1995
 Whether output and CPI inflation are mismeasured, by Nouriel Roubini and David Backus, in Lectures in Macroeconomics
 Rodney Edvinsson, 
 Clifford Cobb, Ted Halstead and Jonathan Rowe. "If the GDP is up, why is America down?" The Atlantic Monthly, vol. 276, no. 4, October 1995, pages 59–78
 Jerorn C.J.M. van den Bergh, "Abolishing GDP"
 GDP and GNI in OECD Observer No246-247, Dec 2004-Jan 2005

 
National accounts